Nikita Sergeyevich Khokhlov (born 25 April 1996) is a Russian football player.

Club career
He made his debut in the Russian Professional Football League for FC Sokol Saratov on 9 September 2013 in a game against FC Tambov. He made his Russian Football National League debut for Sokol on 29 November 2015 in a game against FC Sibir Novosibirsk.

References

1996 births
Living people
Russian footballers
Association football defenders
FC Sokol Saratov players
FC Dynamo Kirov players